Platyptilia exaltatus is a moth of the family Pterophoridae. It is found in India.

References

Moths described in 1867
exaltatus
Endemic fauna of India
Moths of Asia